Iota Aquilae, Latinized from ι Aquilae, is the Bayer designation for a star in the equatorial constellation of Aquila. It has the traditional name Al Thalimain , which it shares with λ Aquilae. The name is derived from the Arabic term الظليمین al-ẓalīmayn meaning "The Two Ostriches". With an apparent visual magnitude of 4.364, this star is bright enough to be seen with the naked eye. At that distance, the visual magnitude of the star is diminished by 0.15 from extinction caused by intervening gas and dust.

Although Iota Aquilae is listed in star catalogues as a giant star, calculations of its dimension show that in reality it is a main-sequence star. It has nearly five times the mass of the Sun and five to six times the Sun's radius. It is emitting 851 times the luminosity of the Sun from its outer atmosphere at an effective temperature of 14,552 K, giving it the blue-white hue of a B-type star. The projected rotational velocity of this star is 55 km/s. Even though it is only around 100 million years old, it has already spent 91% of its allotted lifetime on the main sequence.

Nomenclature

This star, together with η Aql, θ Aql, δ Aql, κ Aql and λ Aql were consist Antinous, the obsolete constellation.

References

External links
 Image Iota Aquilae
 HR 7447
 The Constellations and Named Stars

Al Thalimain
184930
Aquilae, Iota
Aquila (constellation)
B-type giants
096468
Aquilae, 41
7447
Durchmusterung objects